Dale Darwin (or perhaps Dudley) Gear (February 2, 1872 – September 23, 1951) was a Major League Baseball pitcher and outfielder. Gear was the first Major League Baseball player produced by the Kansas Jayhawks baseball program.

References

External links

1872 births
1951 deaths
19th-century baseball players
Cleveland Spiders players
Washington Senators (1901–1960) players
Major League Baseball pitchers
Baseball players from Kansas
People from Anderson County, Kansas
Kansas Jayhawks baseball players
Kansas City Blues (baseball) players
Little Rock Travelers players
Birmingham Barons players
Mobile Sea Gulls players
Shreveport Pirates (baseball) players
Austin Senators players
Kansas City Blues (baseball) managers